The Brock Avion is an American ultralight aircraft that was designed and produced by Ken Brock Manufacturing, a company usually noted for its gyroplanes. The Avion was supplied as a kit for amateur construction.

Design and development
The Avion features a strut-braced high-wing, single-seat, open cockpit, single pusher engine configuration, and is equipped with tricycle landing gear.

The aircraft is made from bolted together aluminum tubing, with the wing ribs constructed from stamped aluminum. The wing and tail covering is Dacron sailcloth. Its  span wing is supported by "V" lift struts. The tail is mounted to a straight aluminum tube that passes above the pusher propeller. Both the elevator and rudder are all-flying surfaces; the ailerons are full-span. The fuel tank was integral with the pilot's seat and common with Brock's gyroplane designs. The pilot sits on the seat in the open air, with no windshield. The landing gear is of tricycle configuration and features a steerable nosewheel and hydraulic brakes. The Avion can be assembled for flight in 30 minutes.

The Avion underwent a complete engineering stress analysis by Bob Hovey, the designer of the Hovey Delta Bird and Hovey Whing Ding II. The Avion was designed to +6/-4g.

Specifications (Avion)

References

External links
Photo of a Brock Avion

1980s United States ultralight aircraft
Homebuilt aircraft
Ken Brock aircraft
Single-engined pusher aircraft